Toki Pilioko (born 1 October 1995) is a French rugby union prop and actor. He currently plays for RC Bassin d'Arcachon in Fédérale 1.

Acting career
Pilioko gained international success by interpreting a young man from the French oversea collectivity of Wallis and Futuna in the South Pacific who comes to play rugby in France in the 2016 film Mercenary. The film was screened in the Directors' Fortnight section at the 2016 Cannes Film Festival where it won the Europa Cinemas Label Award. Pilioko was also in the running for the César Award for Most Promising Actor.

References

1995 births
Living people
People from Nouméa
French rugby union players
US Dax players
New Caledonian rugby union players
Rugby union players from Wallis and Futuna
French people of Wallis and Futuna descent
Rugby union props